Fabricio André Bernard Di Paolo, known professionally as Lord Vinheteiro, is a Brazilian pianist, accordionist, sound engineer, musician, aquarist, and YouTuber. He is known for playing piano covers on his YouTube channel where he has over 6 million subscribers, as well for his controversial opinions over different subjects. He was a part of the Pânico program, from Jovem Pan FM in Brazil.

Career 
Vinheteiro started learning music at the age of 8, studying mainly piano and violin in private lessons; later, he entered the Arts Institute (IA) of UNESP, but didn't finish the course. Besides piano and violin, Vinheteiro is a music producer and sound engineer who also taught himself harpsichord, electric bass, guitar, drums, synthesizer and accordion. Vinheteiro has a veterinarian college degree, but his commitment to music never allowed him to work as a veterinarian.

In 2008, he created the YouTube channel Lord Vinheteiro, which became an internet hit by playing piano versions of classic songs from television, cinema, anime and video games. He participated in Brazilian programs such as Jornal Nacional and The Noite com Danilo Gentili and performed in China with local musicians.

Lord Vinheteiro produces content almost weekly for his YouTube channel, with over 6 million subscribers. He is also popular on the Chinese video website Bilibili, with over 2 million followers, and has also participated in events held by Bilibili.

Controversies 

Vinheteiro is known for his sharp criticisms of Brazilian funk music style and his fiercely elitist positions towards Brazilian culture, sociopolitics and music. He constantly attacks elements of Brazilian music, and posted a video of himself at a construction site holding a toilet out of a window, wherein he loudly says "here inside lays the Brazilian music, it is full of Brazilian funk" and tosses it, smashing the toilet on the ground, saying in the end "this is what Brazilian music deserves".

On his Twitter account, where the musician expresses his opinions more frequently, he once affirmed that "while rich people are learning to invest in stock markets, poor people are playing videogames and having 10 kids".

On the radio program Pânico from Jovem Pan FM, in an interview with the Brazilian philosopher Eduardo Marinho, Vinheteiro mentioned that he "feels pleasure on handing money to homeless poor people, and believes that it brings him personal satisfaction".

References

External links 
 
 

Brazilian pianists
Brazilian classical pianists
Male classical pianists
Brazilian musicians
Brazilian classical musicians
Brazilian humorists
Brazilian YouTubers
Brazilian people of Italian descent
YouTube channels launched in 2008
1980 births
Living people